The 1996 ATP Super 9 (also known as Mercedes-Benz Super 9 for sponsorship reasons) were part of the 1996 ATP Tour, the elite tour for professional men's tennis organised by the Association of Tennis Professionals.

Results

Titles won by player

Singles

See also 
 ATP Tour Masters 1000
 1996 ATP Tour
 1996 WTA Tier I Series
 1996 WTA Tour

External links 
 Association of Tennis Professionals (ATP) official website

ATP Tour Masters 1000